Odd Stokke Gabrielsen (born 1951) is a Norwegian biochemist.

He studied at the University of Oslo, taking the cand.mag. degree in 1973 and cand.real. in 1977. He was a research fellow from 1977 to 1983 under Tordis Øyen, became an associate professor in January 1992 and professor in May 1993. He is a fellow of the Norwegian Academy of Science and Letters.

He resides in Oslo.

References

1951 births
Living people
University of Oslo alumni
Academic staff of the University of Oslo
Norwegian biochemists
Members of the Norwegian Academy of Science and Letters